St Mary's Church, Hemel Hempstead in Hertfordshire, United Kingdom, is the parish church of the town and its oldest place of worship. It is a Grade I listed building.

Background

Construction commenced in 1140 and the church was dedicated in 1150 although construction continued for another 30 years. It is not known why such a grand church was constructed in what at the time was a small hamlet.

The building is cruciform in shape, with a chancel (the first part to be built), a nave, south and north transepts, and a tower. A spire, one of the tallest in Europe, was added in the 14th century with a total height of 200 feet. It is topped by a gilded weather vane. A 19th century vestry was added on the church's north east corner. The church is built from the local clunch stone and flint with some addition of Roman bricks. The architecture is Norman throughout apart from porches added in the 14th and 15th centuries.

In 1302 a cell to Ashridge Priory was founded in Hemel Hempstead and the church had collegiate status until the Dissolution of the monasteries in 1536. A door at the base of the tower allowed the monks access to the church and avoided them mixing with the townspeople.

The church contains a memorial to Sir Astley Paston Cooper. There is a Walker organ which was refurbished in 2008.

A ring of five bells was recorded in the reign of Edward VI. None of these remain and the present ring is of 8 bells dating from 1590 to 1767.  In 1950, as part of the 800th anniversary, the bells were retuned by Gillett and Johnston of Croydon and rehung on steel frames with completely new fittings.  The eight bells are inscribed as follows:

1. (Treble) Lester and Pack - 1758

2. Lester and Pack - 1758

3. Chandler made me - 1688

4. Praise the Lord - 1633

5. Lawdate Domini - undated

6. God save King James - 1604

7. Sana Manet Christi - 1617

8. (Tenor) Lester and Pack - 1767	

The font is original Norman, although surrounded by 19th century decoration.

References

 St Mary's Church guidebook with foreword by the rector Peter Cotton, 2008

External links
St Mary's parish website
Diocese of St Albans

Hemel Hempstead, St. Mary's Church
Former collegiate churches in England
History of Hertfordshire
Tourist attractions in Hertfordshire
Hemel Hempstead, St. Mary's Church